Chinese singer-songwriter, rapper, actor and model Huang Zitao has released multiple records under the stage name Z.Tao.

Albums

Studio albums

Extended plays

Single albums

Singles

As lead artist

As featured artist

Soundtrack appearances

Guest appearances

Music videos

References

Discographies of Chinese artists